Bhadrak (Sl. No.: 44) is a Vidhan Sabha constituency of Bhadrak district, Odisha.
The constituency includes Bhadrak and Bhadrak block.

Elected Members

Sixteen elections held during 1961 to 2014 including a by election in 1971. Elected members from the Bhadrak constituency are:
2014: (44): Jugal Kishore Pattnaik (Biju Janata Dal)
2009: (44): Jugal Kishore Pattnaik (Biju Janata Dal)
2004: (18): Naren Pallai (Indian National Congress)
2000: (18): Biren Palai (Indian National Congress)
1995: (18): Prafulla Samal (Janata Dal)
1990: (18): Prafulla Samal (Janata Dal)
1985: (18): Jugal Kishore Pattnaik  (Congress)
1980: (18): Jugal Kishore Pattnaik (Indian National Congress)
1977: (18): Ratnakar Mohanty (Janata Party)
1974: (18): Jugal Kishore Pattnaik (Indian National Congress)
1971: (By poll): B Sahu (Utkal Congress)
1971: (18): Harekrushna Mahatab (Orissa Jana Congress)
1967: (18): Nityananda Mohapatra (Orissa Jana Congress)
1961: (123): Nityananda Mohapatra (Independent)
1957: (87): Nityananda Mohapatra (Independent)
1951: (57): Mahamad Hanif (Indian National Congress)

Election results

2019

2014 Election Result
In 2014 election, Biju Janata Dal candidate Jugal Kishore Pattnaik defeated Indian National Congress candidate Naren Pallai by a margin of 23,587 votes.

2009 Election Result
In 2009 election, Biju Janata Dal candidate Jugal Kishore Pattnaik defeated Indian National Congress candidate Naren Pallai by a margin of 21,428 votes.

Notes

References

Assembly constituencies of Odisha
Bhadrak district